Parsabad Moghan Ardebil Football Club is an Iranian football club based in Ardebil, Iran.

Season-by-Season

The table below shows the achievements of the club in various competitions.

See also
 Hazfi Cup 2010–11

Football clubs in Iran
Association football clubs established in 2008
2008 establishments in Iran
Sport in Ardabil Province